Barracoon: The Story of the Last "Black Cargo" is a non-fiction work by Zora Neale Hurston. It is based on her interviews in 1927 with Oluale Kossola (also known as Cudjoe Lewis) who, at that time, was presumed to be the last survivor of the Middle Passage. Two female survivors were subsequently recognized, but Cudjoe continued to be identified as the last living person with clear memories of life in Africa before passage and enslavement. 

Hurston could not find a publisher for her manuscript during her lifetime, partly because she preserved Cudjoe Lewis's vernacular English in quoting him from their interviews, and partly because she described the involvement of other African people in the business aspects of Atlantic slave trade. The manuscript, which was in the Alain Locke Collection at the Moorland-Spingarn Research Center, Howard University, remained unpublished until the 21st century. Excerpts were first published in Wrapped in Rainbows: The Life of Zora Neale Hurston, a 2003 biography of Hurston by Valerie Boyd; the full book Barracoon was published in 2018.

See also

 Barracoon
 Clotilda (slave ship)

References

Further reading
 
 

2018 non-fiction books
Slave narratives
Works by Zora Neale Hurston
Books published posthumously
Amistad Press books